Rue Marbeuf is a street in the 8th arrondissement of Paris. It starts at No. 20 Avenue George V and ends at  No. 39 Avenue des Champs-Élysées. It is 460 m long and 16 m wide. The original Berluti store is at 26, rue Marbeuf.

See also
Man Ray (bar)

References

External links

Marbeuf